Diana Venter (born 24 July 1966) is a South African-born, New Zealand cricket umpire. She has stood as an umpire in international matches featuring the New Zealand women's cricket team.

Career

References

External links
 
 

1966 births
Living people
New Zealand cricket umpires
Sportspeople from the Transvaal Colony